Nefret Emerson (née Forth) is a fictional character from a series of historical mystery novels written by Elizabeth Peters and featuring fictional sleuth and archaeologist Amelia Peabody.

Nefret is introduced in The Last Camel Died at Noon, in which the Emersons set off into the Sudan, to find out whether Willy Forth, an old acquaintance of Emerson, is still alive after setting out years earlier, with his pregnant wife in tow, to find a mysterious hidden oasis. After being stranded in the desert without water, transportation or guides, they are rescued by one of their servants, who leads them to a lost civilization in a far-off valley. The settlement seems to have developed from a lost tribe of Cush and preserves many of the customs and lore that Amelia and Emerson have only read about.

In the midst of a power struggle between two brothers and claimants to the throne – one good and one evil – the Emersons find that Willy Forth and his wife did make it to this land, and that they left a daughter, raised entirely within the culture of ancient Egypt, and now thirteen years old. Willy Forth is dead, but to their astonishment they find his wife also sheltered by the inhabitants, demented and obese.  The good brother ascends the throne, and decides it is best for Nefret to return with the Emersons.

Nefret's last surviving relative is her grandfather, Lord Blacktower. Knowing the old man's reputation for depravity, the Emersons convince him to let them adopt Nefret. (Emerson even darkly speculates that it was the old man, not Willy Forth, who fathered Nefret with his own daughter-in-law, though he has no proof.) Eventually, Lord Blacktower dies and leaves her a large fortune. She decides to do her best to learn about and live with English culture, but (to Amelia's secret satisfaction), she stands out as an independent, intelligent, bold and (to Amelia's dismay) mischievous woman.

Ramses Emerson, meanwhile, is smitten with Nefret from the moment he sees her, which evolves into a mature love over the course of several stories. After some monumental misunderstandings between them, he and Nefret are finally married after the events of He Shall Thunder in the Sky. 

Thanks to her fortune, Nefret goes to medical school, becomes a surgeon, and opens a clinic in Cairo for prostitutes and poor women.

Ramses and Nefret have two children, twins Charlotte ("Charla") and David John, and at the end of Tomb of the Golden Bird it is revealed that Nefret is pregnant again.

In the Vicky Bliss series' final installment, The Laughter of Dead Kings, it is revealed that main character John Tregarth is the descendant of the youngest of Ramses and Nefret's three children, an as-yet unnamed daughter. It is also mentioned that the children "bred like rabbits," and that at the time of Dead Kings, over eighty people are descended from Ramses and Nefret's offspring.

Nefret is described as slim, with red-gold hair and a beautiful (though untrained) singing voice. She is adept with knife, bow, and medical kit. Her name means "beautiful" in the language of the civilization where she was raised.  Her Egyptian nickname is Nur Misur, "Light of Egypt".

References

Characters in the Amelia Peabody novel series
Fictional physicians